The 1999 Sydney International women's doubles was the doubles event of the fourteenth edition of the ASB Classic; a WTA Tier II tournament and the second most prestigious women's tennis tournament held in Australia. Martina Hingis and Helena Suková were the defending champions but did not compete that year.

Elena Likhovtseva and Ai Sugiyama won in the final 6–3, 2–6, 6–0 against Mary Joe Fernández and Anke Huber.

Seeds

Draw

Qualifying

Seeds

Qualifiers
  Sonya Jeyaseelan /  Janet Lee

Qualifying draw

External links
 1999 Sydney International Women's Doubles Draw

Women's Doubles
Sydney International